The Soviet Union (USSR) competed at the 1972 Winter Olympics in Sapporo, Japan.

Medalists

Alpine skiing

Men

Men's slalom

Women

Biathlon

Men

Men's 4 x 7.5 km relay

Cross-country skiing

Men

Men's 4 × 10 km relay

Women

Women's 3 × 5 km relay

Figure skating

Men

Women

Pairs

Ice hockey

Medal round

USSR 9-3 Finland
USSR 3-3 Sweden
USSR 7-2 USA
USSR 9-3 Poland
USSR 5-2 Czechoslovakia

Luge

Men

(Men's) Doubles

Women

Nordic combined 

Events:
 normal hill ski jumping 
 15 km cross-country skiing

Ski jumping

Speed skating

Men

Women

Bibliography

References

Official Olympic Reports
International Olympic Committee results database
 Olympic Winter Games 1972, full results by sports-reference.com

Nations at the 1972 Winter Olympics
1972
Winter Olympics